King's Hedges is an electoral ward in the north of the city of Cambridge, England.

History
The open land to the north of Cambridge that now comprises King's Hedges was known as Albrach from as early as the 13th century. In 1558 it was agreed that Richard Brakyn could inclose all 34 acres of Albrach, following which it was renamed Kings Hedges  (without an apostrophe, which was introduced into English in the sixteenth century in imitation of French practice.).

The name is believed to have derived from the fact that it is on the site of the ancient King's warren, or game preserve, where hedges were grown to direct the animals into areas where the hunters could easily catch or kill them.

Development
Development of the King's Hedges estate to the north west of Campkin Road began in 1967, and by 1986 a total of 1570 households had been built on the 125-acre site, largely in blocks of three and four storeys, and reaching the city limits. These council estates were occupied predominantly by families removed from older parts of the city, and there were initially numerous complaints of vandalism and about the lack of community facilities.

The estate was planned around cycling and walking routes which provide direct paths through the area. This encourages people to travel without cars within the estate. King's Hedges provides the best example of such development in Cambridge. The success of the King's Hedges design has not been replicated in newer developments which revert to car-centric design.

In 2005 the adjacent Orchard Park – previously known as Arbury Park – was begun. Cambridgeshire Guided Busway, opened in 2011, now runs along the edge of the King's Hedges ward.

Local life
The ward has primary schools – King's Hedges Primary School (built 1967–1969) and The Grove Primary School (1963) and two public houses (The Ship and Golden Hind).

The area has bus and road connections to the centre of Cambridge as well as ready access to the outskirts and the A14 trunk road. It is home to the Cambridge Regional College further education college, as well as a number of local pubs and shops, and the Cambridge Science Park is adjacent to the ward.

References

External links
 King's Hedges Primary School

Wards of Cambridge